Ignacy Sobieszczański (1872-1952) was a Polish engineer, activist, and an emigree to Siberia during the late Russian Empire. He became an important prospector and merchant in Siberia in the early 20th century.

References 

1872 births
1952 deaths
Polish engineers
Polish activists
History of Siberia
Polish businesspeople